Gareth Morgan Price (18 August 1917 – 19 July 1992), also known by the nickname of "Big G", was a Welsh rugby union and professional rugby league footballer who played in the 1940s and 1950s, and coached rugby league in the 1950s.

Background
Gareth Price was born in Llanelli, Wales and he died aged 74 from pancreatic cancer at Leeds General Infirmary, West Yorkshire, England.

International honours
Gareth Price won 11 caps for Wales in 1945–1948 while at Leeds.

Genealogical information

Gareth Price lived in Headingley, and following his retirement from rugby league, he and his wife Sheila, opened up a Newsagent's shop on North Lane, Headingley, he retired from work a few years before his death, he died 6-weeks after returning from holiday in Torrevieja, Spain.

Gareth Price was cremated, and his ashes were scattered at Lawnswood Cemetery, Leeds along with his mother-in-law, father-in-law, his grandchild David Christopher, and also his good friend, and fellow rugby footballer; Thomas Leslie "T.L."/"Les" Williams. His wife Sheila Price, died during November 2010.

References

External links

1917 births
1992 deaths
Deaths from cancer in England
Deaths from pancreatic cancer
Doncaster R.L.F.C. coaches
Doncaster R.L.F.C. players
Halifax R.L.F.C. players
Leeds Rhinos players
Llanelli RFC players
Rugby league centres
Rugby league players from Llanelli
Rugby union players from Llanelli
Wales national rugby league team players
Welsh rugby league coaches
Welsh rugby league players
Welsh rugby union players